Scott Edward Klingenbeck (born February 3, 1971) is an American former Major League Baseball pitcher who played in parts of four seasons with the Baltimore Orioles, Minnesota Twins, and Cincinnati Reds.

A native of Cincinnati, Ohio, Klingenbeck graduated from Oak Hills High School in 1989, and attended Allegany College of Maryland and Ohio State University. In 1991, he played collegiate summer baseball with the Chatham A's of the Cape Cod Baseball League. He was selected by the Orioles in the 5th round of the 1992 MLB Draft.

References

External links

1971 births
Cincinnati Reds players
Living people
Ohio State Buckeyes baseball players
Ohio State University alumni
Chatham Anglers players
Major League Baseball pitchers
Kane County Cougars players
Frederick Keys players
Bowie Baysox players
Rochester Red Wings players
Salt Lake Buzz players
Indianapolis Indians players
Nashville Sounds players
Baseball players from Cincinnati
American expatriate baseball players in Australia
Perth Heat players